Tsolmon (Mongolian: Цолмон) is a Mongolian given name used for men and women meaning Venus. Notable people with the name include:

Adiyaasambuugiin Tsolmon (born 1992), Mongolian judoka
Dorjpalamyn Tsolmon (born 1957), Mongolian cyclist

Mongolian given names